Bugs Bunny's Thanksgiving Diet is an animated television special released on November 15, 1979; it stars Bugs Bunny and incorporated parts of several Looney Tunes cartoons. The special followed up on the successful Looney Tunes special Bugs and Daffy's Carnival of the Animals that had aired in 1976, which reintroduced the character of Bugs Bunny in his first new material since 1964.

In the special, Bugs is a doctor, prescribing cartoons for the viewers to watch. The special includes two complete cartoons, Bedeviled Rabbit and Rabbit Every Monday, and clips from eight others.

Cast
Mel Blanc as Bugs Bunny, Porky Pig, Wile E. Coyote, Yosemite Sam, Sylvester and Tasmanian Devil
 June Foray as Millicent (from 1957's Rabbit Romeo) and Yellow Female Rabbit

Credits
Directed by David Detiege, Friz Freleng, Chuck Jones and Robert McKimson.
Produced by Hal Geer.

Cartoons featured
Rabbit Every Monday
Stop! Look! And Hasten!
Guided Muscle
Zip Zip Hooray!
Beep, Beep
Tweet Dreams
Birds Anonymous
Freudy Cat
Canned Feud
Trip For Tat
Bedevilled Rabbit

Home Video
The special was released as part of the Looney Tunes Holiday Triple Feature DVD set along with Daffy Duck's Thanks-for-giving Special, Bugs Bunny's Howl-oween Special, and Bah, Humduck! A Looney Tunes Christmas.

References

External links
 
 
 

1979 in American television
1979 television specials
1970s American television specials
1970s American animated films
Animated television specials
1979 films
1970s animated television specials
CBS television specials
Bugs Bunny films
Looney Tunes television specials
Thanksgiving television specials